Josimar Quiñonez Sánchez (born 26 March 1987) is a Colombian footballer. His last club was Palestino.

References
 
 

1987 births
Living people
Colombian footballers
Colombian expatriate footballers
América de Cali footballers
Cerro Largo F.C. players
Club Deportivo Palestino footballers
Chilean Primera División players
Expatriate footballers in Chile
Expatriate footballers in Uruguay
Association football defenders
Sportspeople from Nariño Department
21st-century Colombian people